is one of 24 wards of Osaka, Japan. It is best known for its large parkland, Tsurumi-Ryokuchi, the site of the 1990 International Garden Exposition.

Education

Osaka Shin-ai College Tsurumi Campus is located here.

Points of interest
 Sakuya Konohana Kan

References

External links

Official website of Tsurumi 

Wards of Osaka
World's fair sites in Osaka